A march battalion (or ) is a military unit comprising replacement and support personnel, usually for a regiment or brigade-sized formation.

The term rear echelon – especially in the armies of the UK and other Commonwealth countries – refers to units serving analogous functions, at military formations of any size. These have included, during the early 20th Century, the replacement depots of the US Army, which supported larger formations, such as field armies (or "numbered armies"), army groups or entire military theaters.

A march battalion, in the narrowest and original sense of the term, is a temporary unit made up of assorted replacement personnel destined for the regular battalions of an infantry regiment or brigade. March battalions were intended to maintain military discipline and give personnel a command structure while they were being transferred to operational duties and/or during a transitional period.

In the broader sense, a march battalion may be a standing unit that includes both company- or platoon-sized detachments of reserve or replacement personnel, prior to individuals receiving a specific field posting, as well as similar-sized support units, such as a headquarters company, military police, field security and/or guard detachments and units from service/logistics corps (such as field kitchens).

History 
In the French Army, in which they originated, Bataillons de Marche derived their name from the fact that they were initially temporary units that followed the main body of a parent infantry regiment, on foot, in a rapid march. Such battalions were usually formed at a barracks, regimental depot or mobilization center, to gather late-comers, raw recruits and/or personnel transferred from other regiments, after a regiment had left for the front. They sometimes included small units made up of irregulars/auxiliaries (such as tabors from French colonies in North Africa).

March battalions were used extensively by many European armies from the early 19th Century onwards, including those of Austria-Hungary, Germany, Poland, the Russian Empire and the Soviet Union.

During the later stages of World War II, as the strength of the German Wehrmacht was increasingly depleted, march battalions became improvized combat units, with an average strength of 800–1,000 personnel in three to five companies, as well as a small headquarters company and a field kitchen. Their equipment often consisted only of small arms (e.g. rifles) and some machine guns.

The nature of modern conflicts, the change from conscript to professional armies, as well as innovations in the field of logistics, make the march battalion seemingly mostly obsolete.

See also
Marching regiment
Penal military unit

Ad hoc units and formations
Battalions